Robert Swain may refer to:

 Robert E. Swain (1875–1961), American chemist and professor at Stanford University
 Robert C. Swain (1908–1989), American chemist and businessman, son of Robert E. Swain
 Robert Swain (artist) (born 1940), American painter
 Robert Swain (footballer) (1944–2016), English footballer

See also
 Robert Swain Gifford (1840–1905), landscape painter
 Robert Swain Peabody (1845–1917), architect